The 1929 All-Ireland Senior Football Championship was the 43rd staging of Ireland's premier Gaelic football knock-out competition. Kerry were the winners. Starting their 1st 4 in a row stopped Kildare's bid for 3rd in a row.

Results

Connacht Senior Football Championship

Leinster Senior Football Championship

Munster Senior Football Championship

Ulster Senior Football Championship

All-Ireland Senior Football Championship

Championship statistics

Miscellaneous

 Kilkenny vs Louth game remains Kilkenny's last winning game in the Leinster championship.
 The All Ireland semi-final between Kildare and Monaghan was the first meeting between the teams.

References

All-Ireland Senior Football Championship